Gunthorpe is a civil parish and a hamlet in the county of Rutland in the East Midlands of England.

The village's name means 'outlying farm/settlement of Gunni'.

The population of Gunthorpe grew to several hundred before being devastated by the plague which ravaged Great Britain and much of Europe from 1347 to 1351. Today, Gunthorpe remains as one of Rutland's smallest inhabited hamlets, with just 10 houses and 16 residents. Despite being dissected by the railway and the main Oakham to Uppingham A6003 road, the tiny hamlet of Gunthorpe remains a lively idyll, which typifies the agricultural heart of the county of Rutland. Set in the rolling hills adjoining the River Gwash, approximately 2½ miles south of Oakham and on the western shores of Rutland Water, Gunthorpe has several footpaths and bridleways which offer some of the county's most enjoyable, all-year round views. The population of the civil parish remained less than 100 at the 2011 census and was included in the civil parish of Manton.

The estate was sold by the Earl of Ancaster to Charles Harvey Dixon in 1906.

Gunthorpe's oldest surviving building was built circa 1840. Now a farmhouse, the Durham Ox Inn was a popular haunt of the navvies and labourers engaged in the construction of part of the railway which became known as the London Midland and Scottish Railway, running between Kettering and Oakham from the mid 19th Century and to this day.

References

External links

Hamlets in Rutland
Civil parishes in Rutland